The Paratriathlon at the 2016 Summer Paralympics – Women's PT2 event at the 2016 Paralympic Games took place at 10:03 on 11 September 2016 at Fort Copacabana.

Results

Source: 

Paratriathlon at the 2016 Summer Paralympics